Börje Hörnlund  (born 17 June 1935) is a Swedish retired politician. He was a member of the Centre Party. Hörnlund was Ministry of Employment between 1991 and 1994.

References

Centre Party (Sweden) politicians
1935 births
Living people
Swedish Ministers for Nordic Cooperation